Gazneshk (also Romanized as Gazenshak and Gaznishk) is a village in Karghond Rural District, Nimbeluk District, Qaen County, South Khorasan Province, Iran. At the 2006 census, its population was 544, in 134 families.

References 

Populated places in Qaen County